Hong Song-dam (born 1955) is a South Korean artist who works with woodcuts. He was born on the island of Hauido and raised in Gwangju, where he took part in the 1980 uprising against Chun Doo-hwan's military dictatorship. He became well known for making prints and helping to try and spread the news of what had happened inside the city at the time and made many controversial pieces of art. After the Gwangju Uprising he became politically active, and in July 1989 was arrested for allegedly breaking  the National Security Act (he had sent slides of a mural he had created, along with around 200 other South Korean artists, to North Korea). Amnesty International adopted him as a prisoner of conscience, and he was released from prison in the early 1990s. He is an acclaimed member of the Minjung art movement, and in 1996 was commissioned by the Government of South Korea to create a 42-metre mural for Chonnam National University. He married in 2005 and settled in Ansan. One of his most well known artworks is called Spreading the news.

References

Sources

Bibliography

External links 
 Hong Song-dam's Resurrection at glasgowmuseums.com

1955 births
Amnesty International prisoners of conscience held by South Korea
Living people
South Korean artists
South Korean prisoners and detainees